Where Are You may refer to:

Albums 
 Where Are You? (Frank Sinatra album), 1957
 Where Are You? (Mal Waldron album), 1989

Songs 
 "Where Are You?" (1937 song), written by Jimmy McHugh and Harold Adamson, covered by many performers
 "Where Are You" (Bee Gees song), 1966
 "Where Are You?" (Imaani song), 1998
 "Where Are You?", by 16 Bit, 1986
 "Where Are You?", by Cat Stevens from New Masters, 1967
 "Where Are You?", by Days of the New from Days of the New, 2001
 "Where Are You?", by Gotthard from Firebirth, 2012
 "Where Are You?", by Kavana from Kavana, 1997
 "Where Are You?", by Our Lady Peace from Healthy in Paranoid Times, 2005
 "Where Are You?", by Saves the Day from In Reverie, 2003
 "Where Are You (B.o.B vs. Bobby Ray)", by B.o.B from Strange Clouds, 2012

Films 
 Where Are You (film), a 2021 American drama film

See also 
 Where Are You Now (disambiguation)